The Satevari ( translated as "Dagger" ) MSWP is a proposed multi-caliber modular sniper rifle platform developed by STC Delta intended primarily for military but also limited civilian use. It was designed as convertible precision sniper rifle able to maintain high accuracy over long ranges and maximum effective ranges accordingly to cartridge and corresponding conversion.

Design
The rifle is equipped with an adjustable stock with integrated monopod in support of more stability and accuracy while shooting. A special ergonomic and orthopedic grip was installed in order to provide comfort by reducing the muscle strain of the user hand to a minimum. Active-reactive muzzle breaks reduce overall recoil. The base design can be further altered and modified

Modularity
The rifle design allows a multi-caliber setup with yet unspecified details. A total of 7 cartridge types can be fired with the weapon, ranging from .308 Win to .50 BMG giving it penetration capabilities against both soft and lightly armoured targets.

Accuracy
The designer states an overall accuracy of 0.3 MOA field tested with bipod. Fixed may be more accurate.

Designation
The name "Satevari" comes from a type of ceremonial Georgian dagger which is carried together with a traditional national dress called Chokha. The specific designation may be an implication as to the rifle's accuracy.

See also
List of sniper rifles
Remington MSR
Sako TRG
M24 Sniper Weapon System
KSVK 12.7
OSV-96
OM 50 Nemesis
Barrett M95
Zastava M93
Zastava M12 Black Spear

References

External links
Official website

Sniper rifles
Sniper warfare
Bolt-action rifles
Anti-materiel rifles